"What Can You Do for Me" is a song by English electronic group Utah Saints. It was released on 12 August 1991 as the first single from their debut album, Utah Saints (1992). The song reached number 10 on the UK Singles Chart and number three on the UK Dance Singles Chart. It uses samples from "There Must Be an Angel (Playing with My Heart)" by Eurythmics and "Ain't Nothin' Goin' on But the Rent" by Gwen Guthrie. The title "What Can You Do for Me" is taken from lyrics of "Ain't Nothin' Goin' on But the Rent". A music video was also produced to promote the single.

Chart performance
The single was released in August 1991 and entered the UK Singles Chart on 18 August at number 26. The song steadily rose up the chart and peaked at number 10 on 15 September. The song spent a total of 11 weeks inside the top 75 chart.

In Australia, "What Can You Do for Me" did not enter the ARIA top 100 singles chart until April 1993, following its re-release after the success of "Something Good".

Charts

2012 re-release

A new version of the song remixed by Drumsound & Bassline Smith was released on 26 February 2012.

Track listing

Charts

References

1991 songs
1991 debut singles
2012 singles
Utah Saints songs
Drumsound & Bassline Smith songs
Ministry of Sound singles
Songs written by Annie Lennox
Songs written by David A. Stewart
Songs written by Gwen Guthrie